Massimo Cannizzaro (born 3 April 1981, in Cologne) is a Germanfootball coach and former player.

Personal life
He also holds Italian citizenship.

References

Living people
1981 births
German footballers
German people of Italian descent
Footballers from Cologne
Association football forwards
3. Liga players
SC Fortuna Köln players
1. FC Köln II players
MSV Duisburg players
KFC Uerdingen 05 players
Kickers Emden players
Hamburger SV II players
FC Rot-Weiß Erfurt players
TuS Koblenz players